Droisy is the name of several communes in France:

Droisy, Eure
Droisy, Haute-Savoie